There Is Such a Lad is a 1964 Soviet  comedy film, directed by Vasily Shukshin. The movie is based on Vasily Shukshin's collection of short stories.

Plot
The movie tells the story of an Altai truck driver Pashka Kolokolnikov (played by Leonid Kuravlyov) - a kind, funny, and outgoing person, who loves life. He is a simpleton with a variety of gross provincial expressions and remarks, who likes to make fun of people and play practical jokes. But it turns out that he can also be a hero, when he prevents the explosion of a gasoline truck by risking his life.

Awards
The film won the Lion of Saint Marco prize at the Venice Film Festival in 1964 for Best Children's Film and received an award at the All-Union Film Festival (Leningrad, 1964) for Best Comedy Film ("For the cheerfulness, lyricism and originality").

Cast

 Leonid Kuravlyov as Pashka Kolokolnikov
 Lidiya Chaschina as Nastya Platonova
 Larisa Burkova as Katya Lizunova
 Renita Grigoryeva as a city woman
 Nina Sazonova as Anisya
 Anastasia Zuyeva as Marfa
 Bella Akhmadulina as  journalist 
 Boris Balakin as Kondrat Stepanovich
 Rodion Nakhapetov as Gena
 Viktor Filippov as collective farm chairman
 Ivan Ryzhov as Head tank farms
 Nikolai Fedortsov as Pasha friend
 Yevgeniy Teterin as teacher
 Natalia Gitserot as Leading fashion show
 Yuri Grigoryev as Oleg
 Elena Volskaya as nurse
 Nina Ivanova as Nina

References

External links

1964 films
1964 comedy films
Soviet comedy films
Russian comedy films
1960s Russian-language films
Soviet black-and-white films
Films directed by Vasily Shukshin
Russian black-and-white films